List of Austrian emissaries and ambassadors to the Ottoman Empire (until 1918) and in Turkey (from 1922).

Ambassador

Ambassadors to the Ottoman Empire

References

Turkey
Austria
Foreign relations of Austria
Foreign relations of the Ottoman Empire
Foreign relations of Turkey